William Digby  was a Church of Ireland priest in Ireland.

The grandson of Bishop Simon Digby,  he was educated at Trinity College Dublin. He was Dean of Clonfert from 1766 until his death in 1812. He was appointed a Prebendary of Elphin Cathedral in 1767 and of Kildare in 1770.

References

Deans of Clonfert
17th-century Irish Anglican priests
18th-century Irish Anglican priests
Alumni of Trinity College Dublin
1812 deaths